Victoria Plum may refer to:
 Victoria plum, an English plum cultivar
 A children's literature character from the 1980s created by Angela Rippon
 Plum Sykes, (born 1969) the professional name of British novelist and fashion journalist Victoria Rowland